Chrysopini is a tribe of green lacewings in the family Chrysopidae. There are about 32 genera and 926 described species in Chrysopini.

Genera

 Anomalochrysa McLachlan, 1883 — 19 species
 Apertochrysa Tjeder, 1966 — 183 species
 Atlantochrysa Hölzel, 1970 — 1 species
 Austrochrysa Esben-Petersen, 1928 — 9 species
 Borniochrysa Brooks & Barnard, 1990 — 5 species
 Brinckochrysa Tjeder, 1966 — 23 species
 Ceraeochrysa Adams, 1982 — 62 species
 Ceratochrysa Tjeder, 1966 — 3 species
 Chrysemosa Brooks & Barnard, 1990 — 11 species
 Chrysocerca Weele, 1909 — 6 species
 Chrysopa  Leach in Brewster, 1815 — over 60 sensu stricto, 199 species including incertae sedis
 Chrysoperla Steinmann, 1964 — 67 species
 Chrysopidia Navás, 1911 — 19 species
 Chrysopodes Navás, 1913 — 47 species
 Cunctochrysa Hölzel, 1970 — 10 species
 Eremochrysa Banks, 1903 — 18 species
 Furcochrysa Freitas & Penny - 1 species
 Glenochrysa Esben-Petersen, 1920 — 16 species
 Himalochrysa Hölzel, 1973 — 3 species
 Kostka Navás, 1913 — 1 species
 Kymachyrsa Tauber & Garland, 2014 — 2 species
 Mallada Navás, 1925 — 61 species
 Meleoma Fitch, 1855 — 28 species
 Nineta Navás, 1912 — 18 species
 Parachrysopiella Brooks & Barnard, 1990 — 3 species
 Peyerimhoffina Lacroix, 1920 — 1 species
 Plesiochrysa Adams, 1982 — 29 species
 Rexa Navás, 1920 — 2 species
 Suarius Navás, 1914 — 29 species
 Titanochrysa Sosa and Freitas, 2012 — 6 species
 Tumeochrysa Needham, 1909 — 14 species
 Ungla Navás, 1914 — 26 species
 Yumachrysa Banks, 1950 — 4 species

Gallery

References

External links

Chrysopidae